Jasmine lactone is a lactone and aroma compound with a powerful fatty-fruity peach and apricot flavor. Its chemical formula is C10H16O2. It occurs naturally in jasmine oil, tuberose, gardenia, mimosa, honeysuckle, lily, tea, peach, and ginger. It is used as a food spice and is mainly used for the preparation of apricot, peach, dairy products, and as a tropical fruit flavor.

References 

Delta-lactones
Heterocyclic compounds with 1 ring